Eugene Theodore Agard (August 15, 1932 – December 31, 2017) was an American medical physicist and a former director of the Flower Hospital Oncology Center. Originally from Barbados, he earned a master's degree in physics from the University of London, specifically the Middlesex Hospital Medical School division of the University of London, and a Ph.D. from the University of Toronto in the same field. He was a believer in creationism.

Agard was raised as a member of the Seventh-day Adventist Church. Agard began his higher education in Jamaica at a University of the West Indies campus there. At various times he taught mathematics at Boston University and physics at an institution of higher education in Trinidad and Tobago and at Wright State University.

References

1932 births
2017 deaths
American physicists
University of Toronto alumni
American Christian creationists
Medical physicists
Barbadian emigrants to the United States
Alumni of the University of London
Barbadian expatriates in the United Kingdom
Barbadian expatriates in Canada
Barbadian expatriates in Trinidad and Tobago
Barbadian expatriates in Jamaica
Boston University faculty
Wright State University faculty